Hillaton/Kings Aerodrome  is located adjacent to Hillaton, Nova Scotia, Canada.

References

Registered aerodromes in Nova Scotia
Transport in Kings County, Nova Scotia
Buildings and structures in Kings County, Nova Scotia